Steinkopf  is a hill in Hesse, Germany.

Mountains of Hesse
Reinhardswald